The Adventure of Mr. Philip Collins is a 1925 German silent comedy film directed by Johannes Guter and starring Georg Alexander, Ossi Oswalda and Elisabeth Pinajeff. It was one of two comedy films with which Guter followed up his more melancholy The Tower of Silence. It was shot at UFA's Babelsberg Studios. The film's art direction was by Rudi Feld. It premiered at the Gloria-Palast in Berlin..

Cast
 Georg Alexander as Filip Collin
 Ossi Oswalda as Daisy Cuffler
 Elisabeth Pinajeff as Alice Walters
 Adolf E. Licho as President Cuffler, Daisys Vater
 Alexander Murski as Reeder John Walters, ALices Onkel
 Erich Kaiser-Titz as Austin Bateson
 Paul Biensfeldt as Austins Bruder
 Karl Victor Plagge
 Hans Junkermann
 Karl Platen

References

Bibliography
 
 Jacobsen, Wolfgang . Babelsberg: das Filmstudio. Argon, 1994.

External links

1925 films
1925 comedy films
1920s German-language films
Films of the Weimar Republic
German silent feature films
German comedy films
Films directed by Johannes Guter
Films based on Swedish novels
UFA GmbH films
German black-and-white films
Films produced by Erich Pommer
Silent comedy films
1920s German films
Films shot at Babelsberg Studios